Plover Cove Country Park is a country park in Hong Kong located in the Northeastern New Territories. The original country park was established on 7April 1978, covering  of natural terrain in the administrative North District and Tai Po District. A northern extension to the park, Plover Cove (Extension) Country Park, was designated on 1June 1979, covering the Double Haven islets and Ping Chau.

Ecology

Wild animals residing in the woodlands include Malayan porcupine, Chinese ferret-badger, Chinese pangolin, leopard cat and Pallas's squirrel. There have been records of Indian cuckoo and red-winged crested cuckoo on Kat O and in Lai Chi Wo inside the park.

New and rare species of butterflies in Hong Kong such as yellow coster and bi-spot royal were discovered in the country park recently. Wu Kau Tang and Lai Chi Wo are especially rich in butterflies.

Scenic spots

Geological formations feature in the country park Ping Chau, Ma Shi Chau and Wong Chuk Kok Tsui all contain some of the oldest rock formations in Hong Kong.

Hiking trails within the country park include the Bride's Pool Nature Trail, Tai Mei Tuk Family Walk, Chung Pui Tree Walk, Wu Kau Tang Country Trail and Ping Chau Country Trail in the Plover Cove (Extension) Country Park

Plover Cove (Extension) Country Park

The northern extension of Plover Cove Country Park was designated in 1979. It includes the Double Haven islets and Yan Chau Tong Marine Park. Islands within this part of the park include: Ping Chau (Tung Ping Chau) in Mirs Bay, three islets of Double Haven: Yan Chau, Pak Ka Chau and Pak Sha Tau Tsui. Other islands: Crooked Island, Tui Min Chau, Crescent Island, Double Island, Wu Yeung Chau and Port Island opposite Long Harbour and Tolo Channel.

See also
 Conservation in Hong Kong
 Plover Cove
 Plover Cove Reservoir

References

 Initial text based on information provided by the Hong Kong Agriculture, Fisheries and Conservation Department (AFCD), under the provision that the re-dissemination or reproduction is for non-commercial use. 

Country parks and special areas of Hong Kong
North District, Hong Kong
Tai Po District
1978 establishments in Hong Kong